New Spitalfields Market is a fruit and vegetable market on a  site in Leyton, London Borough of Waltham Forest in East London. The market is owned and administrated by the City of London Corporation. The market is Europe's leading horticultural market specialising in exotic fruit and vegetables - and the largest revenue earning wholesale market in the UK.

History 
It had previously been located at Spitalfields Market just off Bishopsgate, on the east side of the City of London. Due to traffic congestion, lack of space for parking lorries, as well as out of date market buildings (e.g. poor refrigeration facilities) - the market was relocated out of the City in the early 1990s. This followed the move of Covent Garden Market and Billingsgate Fish Market out of the city centre. The new, purpose built location in Leyton opened in May 1991.

The wholesale fruit and vegetable market at Stratford Market - founded in 1879 by the Great Eastern Railway as a competitor to Spitalfields - also closed and consolidated at the New Spitalfields site. The old market on the edge of the City was subsequently regenerated, becoming Old Spitalfields Market - with a range of public markets as well as independent local stores and restaurants.

The market today 
The market hall houses 115 trading units for wholesalers dealing in fruit, vegetables and flowers. Modern facilities in the market hall include cold storage rooms, ripening rooms and racking for palletised produce. The site has extensive parking facilities for customers, delivery vehicles and market personnel.

There are four separate buildings providing modern self-contained units for catering supply companies. Over  of office space is also provided, and there are five ancillary accommodation units with cafes, toilets and maintenance facilities. The services of a diesel/propane supplier, specialist pallet services and forklift truck maintenance companies are also available. Security for the market is provided by the Market Constabulary.

The Old River Lea runs on the western edge of the site.

Future
In early 2019, it was proposed in plans put forward by the Court of Common Council, the City of London Corporation's main decision-making body, that Billingsgate Fish Market, New Spitalfields Market, and Smithfield Market would move to a new consolidated site at Dagenham Dock, and received outline permission in March 2021.

See also
List of markets in London

References

External links
New Spitalfields Market on the City of London website
Spitalfields Market Tenants’ Association

Buildings and structures in the London Borough of Waltham Forest
Wholesale markets in London
Food markets in the United Kingdom
Leyton